Tacarigua (originally San Pablo de Tacarigua) is a town in the East–West Corridor of Trinidad and Tobago, located east of Tunapuna, north of Trincity and west of Arouca.  It is on the banks of the Tacarigua River. The city is governed by the Tunapuna–Piarco Regional Corporation.

Tacarigua was originally a Spanish encomienda, prior to the relocation of the Amerindians to Arima in 1789. Some of the first mosques were built at Tacarigua in 1850. Famous cricket player Kieron Pollard was born here.

References

Populated places in Trinidad and Tobago